New York's 11th State Senate district is one of 63 districts in the New York State Senate. It has  been represented by Democrat John Liu since 2019. Liu defeated IDC-aligned incumbent Tony Avella in the 2018 primary election, after previously losing to him in 2014.

Geography
District 11 is located in Northeast Queens, including a large swath of predominantly Asian Flushing, as well as College Point, Whitestone, Bayside, Douglaston-Little Neck, and parts of Hollis and Bellerose.

The district overlaps with New York's 3rd, 5th, 6th, and 14th congressional districts, and with the 24th, 25th, 26th, 27th, 29th, 32nd, 33rd, and 40th districts of the New York State Assembly .

Recent election results

2020

2018

2016

2014

2012

Federal results in District 11

References

11